Unit 54777 (also known as the 72nd Special Service Center) is a Russian GRU unit reportedly responsible for psychological operations. Unit 54777 retains several front organizations, including InfoRos and the Institute of the Russian Diaspora. The unit originated from Soviet GLAVPUR (Glavnoye  Politicheskoye Upravlenie, or the Main Political Department) and was created in early 1990s and notably employed colonel Aleksandr Viktorovich Golyev, whose memoirs were published in 2020 along with other GRU documents. In the 1990s, the unit focused on pro-Soviet disinformation in newly split republics such as Lithuania and Chechnya. In later years the unit covered a broad range of activities from running NGOs targeting Russian expatriates in Western countries (InfoRos, Institute of the Russian Diaspora, World Coordinating  Council  of  Russian  Compatriots  Living  Abroad, Foundation for Supporting and Protecting the Rights of Compatriots Living  Abroad) and manipulating public opinion in Russia and abroad in preparation for armed conflicts such as in Georgia, Donbas or Syria.

According to a report from Meduza, Alexander Starunsky, a deputy commander of the unit accused of spreading disinformation about the coronavirus was appointed to the Security Council of Russia (Sovbez) in 2021.

References

GRU
Covert organizations
 
Information operations and warfare